Poverty's Paradise is the fourth album from Naughty by Nature, released on May 30, 1995, as their final album under Tommy Boy Records.  It peaked at number 3 on the Billboard 200 and number 1 on the Top R&B/Hip-Hop Albums.  A single released from the album, "Feel Me Flow", achieved major success, peaking at number 17 on the Billboard Hot 100, two other singles "Craziest" and "Clap Yo Hands”, achieved minor success, the former peaking at number 51 on the Hot 100.

At the Grammy Awards of 1996 it won the award for Best Rap Album, which was a new category that year.

Critical reception

James Bernard of Entertainment Weekly praised both Treach and Vinnie for their commanding presence throughout the track listing and felt the record was prime for summer replays, saying "Dominated by rollicking bass lines, chant-along choruses, and the catchy, tight rhyme schemes that are Naughty’s trademark, Poverty is tailor-made for low driving on the beach." AllMusic's Stephen Thomas Erlewine said that "[F]or their third album, Naughty By Nature do little to truly change their style. Some of the beats are little slower and funkier, some of the rhymes are more dexterous, some of the rhythms are a little more complex -- yet nothing distinguishes Poverty's Paradise from the group's two previous, and superior, records." Martin Johnson of the Chicago Tribune said about the album: "Yes, there are many radio-friendly anthemic numbers that could make a nifty summer soundtrack, but the real strength of this record is its consistency; there are no weak spots. Most tracks roll by with New Jersey-styled funk and rollicking rhymes from Treach and Kay Gee, whose lyrics depict the 'hood without romanticizing it." Cheo H. Coker, writing for Rolling Stone, gave note of the record following the same formula as the group's previous efforts: "a few party-starting tracks ("Clap Yo Hands," "Craziest"), some social commentary ("Chain Remains," "Holding Fort") and a barrage of lyrical fury ("Klickcow, Klicow," "Respect Due")", but said that it retains their "sheer funkability" thanks to the "production stylistics" of Kay Gee's work, Vinnie's "improved rhyme skills," and Treach remaining consistent in his vocal conviction, saying "there's emotional substance behind the flashy verbal pyrotechnics."

Track listing

Samples
"Intro Skit"
"Soul Sister Brown Sugar" by Sam & Dave
"Poverty's Paradise"
"Poverty's Paradise" by 24 Carat Black
"Clap Yo Hands"
"I Thank You" by Sam & Dave 
"Eric B. is President" by Eric B. & Rakim
"Devotion (Live)" by Earth, Wind & Fire
"City of Ci-Lo"
"Bones Fly from Spoon's Hand" by Lightnin' Rod
"Hang Out and Hustle"
"Hang out and Hustle" by Sweet Charles
"Feel Me Flow"
"Find Yourself" by The Meters
"Craziest"
"That's All That Matters Baby" by Charles Wright & the Watts 103rd Street Rhythm Band
"Sunshine"
"Everybody Loves the Sunshine" by Roy Ayers
"World Go Round"
"People Make the World Go Round" by Michael Jackson
"What You Do to Me" by Tony Williams
"Klickow-Klickow"
"Funky Worm" by Ohio Players
"Slang Bang"
"Inside My Love" by Minnie Riperton
"Shout Out"
"Our Love Has Died" by Ohio Players
"Connections"
"Hard Times" by Baby Huey & "The What" by The Notorious B.I.G. feat. Method Man

Album chart positions

Weekly charts

Year-end charts

Singles chart positions

Certifications

See also
List of number-one R&B albums of 1995 (U.S.)

References

1995 albums
Naughty by Nature albums
Tommy Boy Records albums
Grammy Award for Best Rap Album